CMT is a Canadian English language discretionary specialty channel owned as a joint venture between Corus Entertainment (which owns a controlling 90% interest) and Paramount Networks Americas (which owns the remaining 10%), owners of the flagship CMT channel in the United States.

As with its U.S. counterpart, CMT previously devoted a large amount of its programming to country music, with such programming as music videos and concert specials. Over time, the channel shifted its focus towards family-oriented general entertainment such as sitcoms, to the point where music programming was eventually axed in August 2017.

It is one of two Paramount-branded channels that are owned by Corus; the companies also partner on Nickelodeon (which is wholly owned by Corus).

History
Prior to the launch of CMT Canada, the U.S.-based country television network, Country Music Television, had been available in Canada since 1984, one year after the channel's launch in the United States.

In June 1994, the Canadian Radio-television and Telecommunications Commission (CRTC) licensed a series of new Canadian specialty television channels; among the ones whose licence was granted was The Country Network, whose programming provisions required it to primarily feature country music videos (a minimum of 90%). The licence was granted to a partnership between Maclean-Hunter (which owned 60% majority control) and Rawlco Communications (which owned the remaining 40%).

At this time, the CRTC had a policy that if a Canadian specialty service was licensed and that service's format was competitive with a foreign service's format that was licensed to operate in Canada, the foreign service could be dropped from the list of channels eligible for cable carriage in Canada. Due to Country Music Television's competitive format, the CRTC terminated CMT's eligibility rights in Canada as a foreign service on June 6, 1994. Television distributors such as cable and satellite television operators could continue distributing Country Music Television until The Country Network began operations.

In March 1994, one year before the channel's launch, Maclean-Hunter had been purchased by Rogers Communications.

On January 1, 1995, the channel launched as New Country Network (NCN). On that date, Canadian pay television service providers were not allowed to offer Country Music Television. In retaliation for being barred from Canada, the U.S. service launched a complaint under the North American Free Trade Agreement and ceased carriage of videos by Canadian artists without major U.S. record deals.

After months of negotiations, the matter was settled when it was announced that CBS Cable, then owners of CMT, would purchase a minority stake in the service. NCN was relaunched as CMT on October 31, 1996. The majority interest was acquired by Shaw Communications at the same time; it was later included in the spinoff of the broadcasting assets then owned by Shaw as Corus Entertainment in 1999. The controversy also resulted in an effective change to CRTC policy – if a foreign channel is already available in Canada and a new Canadian equivalent is subsequently licensed, cable providers are no longer required to drop the foreign service.

In 2016, as part of the removal of the genre protection rules, CMT was migrated to the CRTC's new standard conditions of license for discretionary services; these changes removed the requirement for CMT to air any music programming at all. Corus stated in its description of service for CMT that it would be devoted to comedy and reality programming, films, and "one of a kind music programming".  Despite the changes, Corus must still invest at least 11% of CMT's annual gross revenue to fund the production of Canadian music videos, but they no longer necessarily have to be for country music videos.

These programming changes took effect on August 28, 2017, when CMT dropped all country music video programming from its schedule. The change in programming was widely criticized by stakeholders in Canada's country music industry, due to the loss of what had been a major promotional platform for Canadian performers; Corus stated that it would still promote Canadian country music through its other platforms (including its country music radio stations and some Global programming). This change left Canada without a country music related channel until 2019-20, when rival broadcaster Stingray Group launched Stingray Country across most major and select minor TV providers across Canada.

Programming
When CMT was launched as New Country Network on January 1, 1995, the CRTC required that 90% of the station's programming consist of music videos. The CRTC dropped that requirement to 70% on February 28, 2001, and reduced it even further to 50% on February 28, 2006. With the retirement of genre protection rules in 2016, CMT was no longer required to air music videos, leading to the channel dropping music programming altogether the following year in favor of comedy programming—drawn primarily from off-network reruns of sitcoms.

CMT's current programming consists primarily of acquired sitcoms, talk shows, game shows, reality shows, and lifestyle programming, along with reruns of Canadian-produced series sourced from Corus' sister networks to fulfill Canadian content obligations. In addition to shows sourced from its U.S counterpart, CMT previously produced its own original programming (such as Karaoke Star Jr., Tori & Dean: Cabin Fever, & The Wilkinsons), with the much of channel's country music-related programming hosted by Paul McGuire.

Former hosts/presenters
 Paul McGuire – host of Chevrolet Top 20 Countdown and CMT's Hottest (now at Stingray Radio)
 Casey Clarke (now at Stingray Radio)
 Cliff Dumas (now host of the Weekly Country Countdown)
 Shannon Gaye
 Gnarley Charley (was at KSKS in Fresno, California)
 Stu Jeffries (now at CHBM-FM in Toronto)
 Nicola Jones (was at CHCH in Hamilton, Ontario) - now deceased (October 2014)
 Ashley Kranz (winner of CMT Canada's "CMT Casting Call 2007" competition)
 Elissa Lansdell (was host of My Rona Home)
 Beverley Mahood (was at Breakfast Television Vancouver)
 Melissa Parrott (winner of CMT Canada's "CMT Casting Call 2009" competition)
 Hal Roberts (now News Director and Anchor with Bridge City News on CJIL-TV)
 Colleen Rusholme (now at CJOT-FM in Ottawa, Ontario)
 Greg Shannon (now at CFCW in Edmonton, Alberta)
 Nancy Sinclair
 Brian "Hurricane" Smith
 Tamara Stanners (was at CKPK-FM in Vancouver, British Columbia)
 Lindsay Stone

See also
 CMT (American TV channel)
 Stingray Country

References

External links
 

Canadian country music
Corus Entertainment networks
Television channels and stations established in 1995
1995 establishments in Canada
Analog cable television networks in Canada
English-language television stations in Canada
Country music mass media